Eppertshausen is a municipality in southern Hesse, in the district Darmstadt-Dieburg, Germany. The municipality has a total population of 5,805 inhabitants. Currently, the mayor is Carsten Helfmann, re-elected in 2020.

References

External links
  

Darmstadt-Dieburg
Grand Duchy of Hesse